A Good Man (Spanish Un Hombre bueno) is a 1941 Argentine film directed by Carlos Torres Ríos.

Cast
 Julio Bianquet
 Cayetano Biondo
 Emperatriz Carvajal
 José Castro
 Max Citelli
 Severo Fernández
 Claudio Martino
 Judith Sulian
 Luis Cuda
 Francisco Mileo
 José Plastino
 Warly Ceriani
 Pablo Cumo

External links
 

1941 films
1940s Spanish-language films
Argentine black-and-white films
Argentine drama films
1941 drama films
1940s Argentine films